The 2004 Christchurch mayoral election was part of the 2004 New Zealand local elections. On 9 October of that year, elections were held for the Mayor of Christchurch plus other local government roles. Incumbent Garry Moore successfully contested a third term in office with a decisive majority. The second-placed candidate, Aaron Keown, received almost 50,000 fewer votes than Moore. Keown ran as an Independent, but contested the 2008 general election for ACT New Zealand, standing in the  electorate. The third-placed candidate, Jamie Gough, was only 18 years old at the time.

Both Keown and Gough were elected Christchurch City Councillors at the 2010 local elections.

Results

Voting statistics
Participation in local elections has been falling for years. In the 2004 local election, only 38.6% of registered voters cast their vote. The following table shows the voting statistics since the 1989 local elections:

Table notes:
1 Note that the number of voters reported in the summary report differs by 75 compared to the declaration of results of election.

References

Mayoral elections in Christchurch
2004 elections in New Zealand
Politics of Christchurch
2000s in Christchurch
October 2004 events in New Zealand